Yanping District is a district of Nanping, Fujian province, People's Republic of China. The population of Yanping District was 504,483 at 2016.

Etymology
The name of the district literally means "Prolong Peace", and it is still commonly referred to as Nanping, which was its name before 1995. Nowadays, people still use both "Yanping" and "Nanping" in mailing address, and Nanping is even more common.

History

The city was built as a house at 196 BC. Before that it was a village governed by Houguan County (Fuzhou). Because it is the start point of Min River, it acts as a trading transferring center between North Fujian, Jiangxi and Fuzhou.

Also, it is the last stronghold of Fuzhou, the largest city in Fujian, and usually carefully guarded. Because the soldiers came from north China, the city's dialect was more similar to that of Henan Province.

Yanping District was named Nanping City at 1956, and after the prefecture-level city was named Nanping in 1995, it changed to its current name.

Geography

Waters 
Min River

Jianxi Brook

Futun Brook

Shaxi Brook

Mountains 
Jiufeng Mountain (literally 9-peak mountain)

Yuping Mountain

Culture 
 Snake Festival: it is held in Zhanghu Town on every seventh day of the seventh month on the Chinese calendar.
 Intangible Cultural Heritage: Zhansheng Drum, Nanjian Opera: originated from Xiayang Town, Lingbingyang She song

Industry 
 Fujian Nanping Nanfu Battery Co., Ltd.
 Fujian Nanping Aluminium Co., Ltd.
 Fujian Nanping Paper Co., Ltd.

Administration

Subdistricts 
Meishan Subdistrict
Huangdun Subdistrict
Ziyun Subdistrict
Sihe Subdistrict
Shuinan Subdistrict
Shuidong Subdistrict

Towns 
Laizhou
Zhanghu
Xiadao
Nanshan
Xiqin
Xiayang
Daheng
Taiping
Wangtai
Taqian
Yanghou
Mangdang
Luxia

Townships 
Jukou
Chimen

Social Securities

Hospitals 
 Nanping No.1 Hospital affiliated to Fujian Medical University
 People's Hospital of Nanping affiliated to Fujian University of Traditional Chinese Medicine
 The 92nd Hospital of PLA

Education

Kindergartens 
 Nanping Experimental Kindergarten

Primary schools 
 Nanping Experimental Primary School

junior high school 
Nanping Jianjing junior high school

High schools
 Nanping No.1 Middle School of Fujian

Higher education 
 Fujian Agriculture and Forestry University

Transportation

Railway Station 
 Yanping East railway station
 Yanping West railway station
 Laizhou railway station (formerly Nanping North railway station, freight only, formerly handled passengers)

Coach Station 
 Nanping Coach Station

Bridges 
Jianxi Bridge

Shuidong Bridge

Yuping Bridge

Jianzhou Bridge

Shuinan Bridge

Nanping Bridge

Entertainment

Tourist Attractions 
 Jiufengshan Park (Mt. Jiufeng Park)
 Yuping Park
 Yangzhen Park
 Xiyuan Canyon
 Xingbang Ecological Grape Orchard: located in Shanwei Village, Wangtai Town
 Mandarin-duck-shaped Rocks: located in Gaoping Village, Xiqin Town
 Xiayang Ecological Park: located in Xiayang (Unincorporated) Village, Shangyang Village

Hotels 
 Minbei Hotel (3-star)

Shopping 
 Yonghui Superstore
 Seashine Department Store
 Yuda Baixing Supermarket

Notable people
 Wu Jingbiao: winner of Men's 56 kg weightlifting in 2010 Asian Games, 2011 Asian Weightlifting Championships, 2010 and 2011 World Weightlifting Championships.

See also
List of administrative divisions of Fujian

References

External links

County-level divisions of Fujian
Nanping